Mazi Kalleh (also Romanized as Māzī Kalleh; also known as Muzikalah) is a village in Ahandan Rural District, in the Central District of Lahijan County, Gilan Province, Iran. At the 2006 census, its population was 131, in 34 families.

References 

Populated places in Lahijan County